Alexsandro is a male given name. It may refer to:

 Alex Fernandes (born 1973), Alexsandro Fernandes Xavier, Brazilian football striker
 Alex (footballer, born 1977), Alexsandro de Souza, Brazilian football attacking midfielder
 Alex Oliveira (footballer) (born 1978), Alexsandro Marques de Oliveira, Brazilian football defender
 Alexsandro (footballer, born 1980), Alexsandro Ribeiro da Silva, Brazilian football forward
 Sandro (footballer, born 1981), Alexsandro Oliveira Duarte, Brazilian football attacking midfielder
 Alex Maranhão (born 1985), Alexsandro Carvalho Lopes, Brazilian football midfielder
 Alex Ferreira (footballer) (born 1986), Alexsandro Ferreira, Brazilian football right-back
 Alexsandro Pereira (born 1987), Brazilian mixed martial artist and kickboxer
 Alexsandro Melo (born 1995), Brazilian long jumper
 Alexsandro (footballer, born 1999), Alexsandro Victor de Souza Ribeiro, Brazilian football centre-back

See also
 Alex Sandro (born 1991), Alex Sandro Lobo da Silva, Brazilian football left-back